"Please Mr. Please" is a song written by Bruce Welch and John Rostill, both members of British pop singer Cliff Richard's backing band, The Shadows. Welch had originally recorded the song himself in 1974 with no commercial success.

In 1975, British-Australian singer Olivia Newton-John recorded and released a version the song as the second and final single from her fifth studio album, Have You Never Been Mellow.

Song story
The song begins as an apparent tribute to the jukebox and how one can listen to a lot of great music for a small price. But instead of continuing along those lines, the song picks up on how some songs on the jukebox can trigger bad memories. This happens when the protagonist—at a tavern with friends, trying to get over a just-broken relationship—sees another customer at the jukebox, trying to play "B-17", which is coded to a song the woman does not want to hear.

The song, she cries, was special to the now-broken relationship. It now triggers sorrowful memories to the point that she never wants to hear the song again. The refrain sees the woman begging the "button-pushin' cowboy" (the ‘Mister’ of the song’s title) not to play the evocative song.

Reception
Record World said that the song is "Olivia's most country-oriented outing yet will also speak as sweetly to her total audience for '. . Please' pleases pop just as perfectly!"

Chart performance
Released as a single in 1975, "Please Mr. Please" reached the Top 10 on three major Billboard charts in the US that year. On the pop chart, the song peaked at number three in August 1975, remaining in the Top 40 for 12 weeks: Newton-John's fifth consecutive Top Ten hit, "Please Mr. Please" would also mark Newton-John's last appearance in the top ten for a three-year period. On the country chart, the song reached #5, while on the adult contemporary chart, the song spent three weeks at number one. The single was a certified Gold record by the RIAA.

Weekly charts

Year-end charts

Cover versions
Juliana Hatfield covered the song on her album Juliana Hatfield Sings Olivia Newton-John.
Claude François covered the song in a French language version entitled "Pourquoi Pleurer (Sur Un Succès D'Été)" which was released as a single in France in 1975, and became the opener and title track of that year's album release by the singer.
Salvadoran singer Evangelina Sol covered the song in a Spanish language version entitled "Por favor Señor, por favor" on her 1975 album "Evangelina".
Dickie Goodman used a sound-alike version of the chorus for his 1975 parody hit single, "Mr. Jaws".

References

1975 singles
Bruce Welch songs
Olivia Newton-John songs
Songs written by John Rostill
Songs written by Bruce Welch
Cashbox number-one singles
RPM Top Singles number-one singles
MCA Records singles
Song recordings produced by John Farrar
Songs about music
Songs about heartache
Songs about jukeboxes
1974 songs